Györgyi may refer to:

Albert Szent-Györgyi (1893–1986), Hungarian physiologist who won the Nobel Prize in Physiology or Medicine in 1937
Albert Szent-Györgyi Medical University, originally established in Kolozsvár, Transylvania, in 1872
Dénes Györgyi (1886–1961), Hungarian architect, a member of the Györgyi-Giergl artistic family
Györgyi Balogh (born 1948), Hungarian former sprinter
Györgyi Farkas (born 1985), Hungarian heptathlete

See also
 György, a given name